Rafi Escudero (born December 30, 1945) is a Puerto Rican musician, singer, composer, poet and political activist.

Early years
Escudero was born and raised in San Juan, Puerto Rico the capital city of the island.  His parents were well aware that their son was musically inclined at a young age.  They also stressed that their son receive a good education and sent him to study in private schools.  They wanted their son to learn about classical music and contracted the services of violin teacher Eduardo Geigel to teach Escudero how to play the violin.  When Escudero wasn't in school or taking violin classes, he would spend hours on the family piano until he finally taught himself how to play.  He perfected his piano playing by taking piano lessons from the maestro Pedro Escabi.

Early influences
During the 1960s, he enrolled in the University of Puerto Rico where he studied humanities.  As a student in the university, he was exposed to the works of some of Puerto Rico's greatest poets, Antonio Machado, Julia de Burgos and Juan Antonio Corretjer.  The works of these poets greatly influenced Escudero and where to serve as the basis for his inspiration.

Modern Danzas
Escudero debuted as a musician by recording modernized versions of classical danzas.  He recorded "Añoranzas", "Carta a Juan Morel" and "Caricias".  The recordings were a success and Escudero received the acceptance and recognition from the public and fellow musicians alike.

During the 1970s, Escudero composed many songs that were recorded by the following singers, Danny Rivera, Marco Antonio Muñiz, Jose Feliciano, Cheo Feliciano, Ismael Miranda and many others.  Escudero recorded 'Sin tu Amor" (Without your Love), "Cuando el amor germina", "Repica ese guiro y canta" and "Pa' cortase las venas".  He also participated with dozens of Latin American singers in the recording of "Somos el Projimo" (We're your neighbor) which was the Latin-American version of "We Are The World". Escudero, appeared in the film "Under Suspicion" starring Morgan Freeman and Gene Hackman as a Ballroom musician and performed on the song "Party Man" written by Miguel Zayas.

Selection of Danza's by Escudero

The following is a list of some of Escudero's Danza's:
Añoranza
Caricias
Carta a Morel

Poet
Escudero wrote two books of poetry.  The first book was titled "En un Mundo de Cuerdos" and the second book "Comentario desde el Soberao", published by the Puerto Rican Institute of Culture.  In 1999, he recorded "Comentario desde el Soberao" where he describes the situations and characters in his book.  This was the first time that a poet/musician combined his poems and music together.

Awards and recognitions
Among the many awards and recognitions bestowed upon Escudero are the following, The Agüeybaná de Oro for composer of the year 1981 and the Outstanding Singer Award in the Record Festivals from 1983 to 1985. Escudero was also exalted into the Puerto Rico Music Hall of Fame on May 12, 2018.

Political activist
In 1998, Escudero was named by Puerto Rico's governor Pedro Rosselló to join the board of directors of the Puerto Rican Institute of Culture and of the Luis A. Ferre Center for the Performing Arts (Centro de Bellas Arts).  In 2001, he ran for the position of president of the New Progressive Party of Puerto Rico, however he withdrew from the race.  Escudero currently remains politically active in the party.

See also

List of Puerto Ricans

References

External links
Popular Culture

1945 births
Living people
Puerto Rican musicians
20th-century Puerto Rican male singers
Puerto Rican poets
Puerto Rican male writers
Puerto Rican male composers
Musicians from San Juan, Puerto Rico
Singers from San Juan, Puerto Rico